H5 is a French design and animation studio founded by Ludovic Houplain and Antoine Bardou-Jacquet in 1994. Under Houplain's art direction, H5's work can mostly be found in the fields of music videos (visuals for Air, Super Discount, Etienne de Crécy, Röyksopp, Le Tone, Alex Gopher, Darkel, Cosmo Vitelli and Demon) and luxury advertising (Dior, Cartier, Hugo Boss, Hermès and Lancôme). Since 1999, H5 has also worked as a collective of directors. They also made their first animated clips, such as animated typography for Alex Gopher, a cartoon for Zebda, digital animations for Super Furry Animals and Playgroup.

H5 made the clips for Röyksopp's "Remind Me" (which won the MTV Europe Award for Best Video in 2002), Massive Attack's "Special Cases", Goldfrapp's "Twist" and a series of advertising campaigns for France and worldwide: Areva, Audi, Citroën, Volkswagen's "Train Fantôme" (1st award Film Cinema, Club of the DA on 2006). H5 is at present represented in France by Addict.

Their first animated short film, Logorama, was selected at the Week of Criticism at the Cannes Film Festival 2009 and at CineVegas in 2009. The film won the Kodak Prix at Cannes and won the Academy Award for Best Animated Short Film at the 82nd Academy Awards.

In parallel, H5's work was presented in numerous exhibitions and festivals, in Paris (National Center of Art and Culture Georges-Pompidou, Paris sleepless night 2007, French National Library, Gallery Anatome), London (Institute of Contemporary Arts, National Museum of Photography, British Film Institute), Tokyo (Sendai Mediatheque), Rotterdam (NAI), New York (MoMA) and Los Angeles (Egyptian Theater).

History 
The H5 design studio was founded in 1993. He specialized at the beginning in the realization of graphic projects then the artistic direction of labels in the field of electronic music (in particular for artists and labels of the French Touch). This collective designs its first animated clips from 1999, in particular that of The Child by Alex Gopher based on 3D animated typography which makes them known and launches the activity of H5 in advertising.

Their 2002 music video for Remind Me Röyksopp, which depicts the day of an average office worker solely using animated infographics footage, is also noted, notably winning Best Music Video at the MTV Europe Music Awards 2002.

Filmography

Music videos
 Chloé – "The Dawn". Production H5 Paris 2018.
 Black Strobe – "For Those Who Came To Earth Thru The Devil’s Asshole". Laurent Chanez & H5, Production H5 Paris 2014.
 Alex Gopher ft. Saint Michel – "Hello Inc.". Production Stink 2012.
 Darkel – "At the End of the Sky". Production Addict 2006.
 Étienne Daho – "Retour à Toi". Production Addict 2003.
 Goldfrapp – "Twist". Production John Payne pour Black Dog Films 2003.
 Audio Bullys – "The Things". Production Philip Tidy pour Black Dog Films 2003.
 Massive Attack – "Special Cases". Production Pete Shuttleworth pour Black Dog Films 2003.
 Röyksopp – "Remind Me". Production John Payne pour Black Dog Films 2002.
 Sinema – "In My Eyes". Production H5 2002.
 Wuz (Alex Gopher & Demon) – "Use Me". Production H5 2002.
 Air – "How Does It Make You Feel". Production Partizan Midi Minuit 2001.
 Playgroup – "Number One". Production Partizan Midi Minuit 2001.
 Super Furry Animals – "Juxtapozed with U". Production Partizan Midi Minuit 2001.
 Alain Souchon – "Rive Gauche". Production Partizan Midi Minuit 2000.
 Zebda – "Oualalaradime". Production Partizan Midi-Minuit 2000.
 Alex Gopher – "The Child". Production Le Village 1999.

Advertising
 Ecologic – Le recyclage, ça marche. Production H5 2011
 Areva – Energy. One powerful story. Production Addict 2010.
 Smart – Cinéma. Production Addict 2010.
 Celsius – Papillon Tourbillon Mobile Phone. Production H5 2010.
 Gatorade – G2. Production Addict 2009.
 Areva – Athlenergy. Production Addict 2009.
 Total – Les Mots. Production Addict 2008.
 Toyota – Breath. Production Addict 2008.
 Volkswagen Touran – Train Fantôme. Production Addict 2007.
 Cartier – Ballon Bleu. Production H5 2007.
 Citroën C4 – Ice Skater. Production H5 2006.
 Toyota Yaris – 1000. Production Addict 2006.
 Areva – Experts en Energie. Production Addict 2004.
 Audi A4 S-line – Un Peu Plus Qu'Une A4. Production Addict 2003.
 Vuitton – Bellaix. Production H5 2003.

Short films
 Logorama – Production Autour de Minuit / H5 2009.

Exhibitions
 Moving Types – Gutenberg-Museum. Mayence 2011
 Collector – Tripostal. Lille 2011
 Graphisme et Création Contemporaine – BNF. Paris 2011
 Type in Motion – Museum Für Gestaltung. Zürich 2011
 L.I.P. (Logo in Peace) – Festival International de l'Affiche et du Graphisme. Chaumont 2010
 New Directors/New Films Festival – Logorama. MoMA. New York 2010
 Hors Piste – H5: d'Alex Gopher à Logorama. Centre Georges-Pompidou. Paris 2010
 One Dot Zero – H5 Retrospective. British Film Institute. Londres 2009
 Design Parade – Villa Noailles. Hyères 2009
 2036 – Biennale Internationale du Design. Saint-Etienne 2008
 La pub s'anime – Musée de la Publicité. Paris 2008
 La Force de l'art – Grand Palais. Paris 2006
 Multiples H5 – Galerie Anatome. Paris 2006
 D.DAY, le design aujourd’hui – Centre Georges-Pompidou. Paris 2005
 Premieres – MoMA. New York 2004
 Clip city – The Netherlands Architecture institute. Rotterdam 2002
 Graphisme(s) – BNF. Paris 2001
 Movement – Sendai Mediatheque. Tokyo 2001

Awards
Logorama
 2011 – César Award for Best Short Film
 2010 – Academy Award for Animated Short Film
 2009 – Best Short Film – Stockholm International Film Festival
 2009 – Kodak Award at la Semaine de la Critique du Festival de Cannes 2009
 2009 – Public Award – Festival international de Curtas Metragans
 2009 – Public Award – Lille International Short Film Festival
 2009 – Special Jury Award, Public Award, Fuji Award for Best Director – Cinanima International Animated Film Festival
 2009 – Best Direction Award, Public Award – Vendome Film Festival
 2009 – Gold medal of animation – Zinebi, Bilbao International Film Festival
Röyksopp – Remind Me
 2002 – MTV Award Best European Music Video. Barcelona
 2002 – Club des DA. 1st Vidéo Clip Award. Paris
Alex Gopher – The Child
 2000 – Club des DA. 1st Vidéo Clip Award. Paris

Bibliography
 This Is the End – Cover art by H5. Editions B42 2009
 Gas Book 18 – H5. Éditions BNN 2005

References

External links
 
 Magazine – Intramuros #150
 Interview – Elephant Magazine Issue #4 
 Interview – Creative Bloq 29.05.2014 

French companies established in 1994
Information technology companies of France
French animation studios
Graphic design studios
Design companies established in 1994
Mass media companies established in 1994